The 2010 Sultan Azlan Shah Cup was the 19th edition of the Sultan Azlan Shah Cup, held between 6–16 May 2010. Due to bad weather, the final between India and Korea was abandoned after 6 minutes and 14 seconds of play. After discussions and consultations between the Tournament Director Paul Richards, the Organising Committee, with the consent of Sultan Azlan Shah, decided that India and Korea would be joint champions for the 19th edition of the Sultan Azlan Shah Cup. It was the 5th title for India and the 2nd for Korea.

Participating nations
Seven countries participated in this year's tournament:

Results
All times are Malaysia Standard Time (UTC+08:00)

First round

Pool stage

Second round

Classification matches

Fifth and sixth place

Third and fourth place

Final

Match abandoned after 6 minutes and 14 seconds due to bad weather, both teams declared joint winners.

Awards
XI Team of the Tournament

Champions
 India
 South Korea

Fairplay
 Egypt

Player of the Tournament
 Sardar Singh

Goalkeeper of the Tournament
 Kumar Subramaniam

Top Scorer
 Nam Hyun-woo (9 goals)

Scorers

9 goals
 Nam Hyun Woo
7 goals
 Christopher Ciriello
6 goals
 Amin Rahim
 Muhammad Imran
5 goals
 Azlan Misron
 Muhammad Zubair
 Tushar Khandekar
 Grant Schubert
 Kieran Govers
4 goals
 Abdul Haseem Khan
3 goals
 Haffihafiz Hanafi
 Tengku Ahmad Tajudin
 Dhananjay Mahadik
 Matt Gohdes
 Sun Long
 Lee Nam Yong
2 goals
 Rajpal Singh
 Paul Ravi
 Shivendra Singh
 You Hyo Sik
 Muhammad Irfan
 Muhammad Rizwan
 Shafqat Rasool
 Yu Yang
 Liu Yixian
 Na Yubo
 Muhamed Hassan

1 goal
 Faizal Saari
 Razie Rahim
 Rizal Nasir
 Arjun Halappa
 Sardar Singh
 Mandip Antil
 Gurbaj Singh
 Mujtaba Danish
 Rupinder Pal Singh
 Sarvanjit Singh
 Timothy Bates
 Trent Mitton
 Matthew Swann
 Russell Ford
 Lee Seung Il
 Cho Suk Hoon
 Yong Sung Hoon
 Oh Dae Keun
 Kim Young Jin
 Ro Jong Hwan
 Muhammad Umar
 Kashif Ali
 Ahmed Mossen
 Muhammad Waqas
 Cui Yongxin
 Luo Fangming
 Sun Tianjun
 Meng Jun
 Hossam Gobran
 Ahmed El Hakim

Final ranking
This ranking does not reflect the actual performance of the team as the ranking issued by the International Hockey Federation. This is just a benchmark ranking in the Sultan Azlan Shah Cup only.

References

2010 in field hockey
Sultan Azlan Shah Cup
2010 in Malaysian sport
2010 in Australian field hockey
2010 in Egyptian sport
2010 in Pakistani sport 
2010 in South Korean sport
2010 in Indian sport
2010 in Chinese sport 
May 2010 sports events in Asia